Valcho Stoev Khristov (born 20 January 1952 in Ovcharovo, Haskovo Province) is a Bulgarian former shot putter who competed in the 1980 Summer Olympics.

He was a gold medallist at the 1975 European Athletics Indoor Championships and the 1977 Universiade. He also won a bronze medal at the 1975 Universiade and was a finalist at the European Athletics Championships in 1974 and 1978, finishing ninth both times. He was a six-time champion at the Balkan Games between 1973 and 1980.

Before taking his European indoor title, he had finished sixth in 1975 and fourth in 1976. He finished his career with a personal best of  He was a four-time national champion indoors and a five-time champion outdoors (mostly finishing behind Nikolai Khristov).

References

External links
 
 
 
 

1952 births
Living people
Sportspeople from Haskovo Province
Bulgarian male shot putters
Olympic athletes of Bulgaria
Athletes (track and field) at the 1980 Summer Olympics
Universiade medalists in athletics (track and field)
Universiade gold medalists for Bulgaria
Medalists at the 1975 Summer Universiade
Medalists at the 1977 Summer Universiade
21st-century Bulgarian people
20th-century Bulgarian people